Tillandsia sceptriformis is a species of flowering plant in the family Bromeliaceae. It is endemic to Ecuador.  Its natural habitat is subtropical or tropical moist montane forests. It is threatened by habitat loss.

References

sceptriformis
Endemic flora of Ecuador
Near threatened plants
Taxonomy articles created by Polbot